The twelfth season of the Chilean reality television show Calle 7 took place between March and May 2013.  The winners were Fernanda Gallardo and Francisco Rodríguez.

Contestants

Teams competition

Elimination order

2013 Chilean television seasons